JAMA Cardiology is a monthly peer-reviewed medical journal covering cardiology. It was established in 2016 and is published by the American Medical Association. The editor-in-chief is Robert O. Bonow (Feinberg School of Medicine). According to Journal Citation Reports, the journal has a 2021 impact factor of 30.154, ranking it 4th out of 143 journals in the category "Cardiac & Cardiovascular Systems".

Abstracting and indexing 
The journal is abstracted and indexed in Index Medicus/MEDLINE/PubMed.

See also
List of American Medical Association journals

References

External links

Cardiology journals
American Medical Association academic journals
Monthly journals
English-language journals
Publications established in 2016